Yeryomin, Eryomin, Yeremin or Eremin is a Russian masculine surname. Its feminine counterpart is Yeryomina, Eryomina, Yeremina or Eremina. The surname is derived from the male given name Yeryoma and literally means Yeryoma's. People with this surname include:

Eremin
 Alexander Eremin (born 1995), Russian male curler

Eremina
 Elena Eremina (born 2001), Russian artistic gymnast

Eryomina
 Larisa Eryomina (born 1950), Soviet stage and screen actress

Yeryomin
 Aleksei Yeryomin (born 1982), Russian football player
 Mikhail Yeryomin (1968–1991), Soviet football player
 Natalia Eremina (born 1967), Latvian chess player
 Oleg Yeryomin (born 1967), Russian football player
 Pyotr Yeryomin (born 1992), Russian ice hockey goaltender
 Stanislav Yeryomin (born 1951), Russian basketball player
 Vladimir Yeryomin (born 1965), Russian football player
 Vladimir Yeryomin (born 1950), Russian actor, screenwriter and producer

Russian-language surnames